Senegalia tenuifolia is a perennial climbing shrub which is native to Asia, the Caribbean, India and South America. Common names are ara a gato, bejuco cochino, tocino. It is not listed as being a threatened species. Senegalia tenuifolia grows to 8 m high and 10–15 cm in diameter.

References

External links
Discover Life Map Senegalia tenuifolia (as ''Acacia tenuifolia')

tenuifolia
Pantropical flora
Flora of Mexico
Trees of South America
Shrubs
Plants described in 1753
Taxa named by Carl Linnaeus